Andrea Cipressa (born 14 December 1963) is an Italian fencer. He won a gold medal in the team foil event at the 1984 Summer Olympics. He is now director of foil for the Italian Fencing Federation. His daughter, Erica Cipressa, is also a foil fencer. He is the Commissario tecnico of the Italy national fencing team.

References

External links 
 
 

1963 births
Living people
Italian male fencers
Italian foil fencers
Olympic fencers of Italy
Fencers at the 1984 Summer Olympics
Fencers at the 1988 Summer Olympics
Olympic gold medalists for Italy
Olympic medalists in fencing
Sportspeople from Venice
Medalists at the 1984 Summer Olympics